Tachina lurida is a species of fly in the genus Tachina of the family Tachinidae that can be found everywhere in Europe, except for Albania, Belarus, Estonia, Ireland, Liechtenstein, Lithuania, Luxembourg, Monaco, San Marino, Scandinavia, Slovenia, Vatican City, and various European islands.

References

Insects described in 1781
Diptera of Europe
lurida